The 2012–13 Morelia season was the 66th professional season of Mexico's top-flight football league. The season is split into two tournaments—the Torneo Apertura and the Torneo Clausura—each with identical formats and each contested by the same eighteen teams. Morelia began their season on July 21, 2012, against Cruz Azul, Morelia played most of their homes games on Fridays at 9:30 local time. Morelia was eliminated in the quarter-finals by América and Cruz Azul in the Apertura and Clausura tournaments respectively.

Torneo Apertura

Squad

Regular season

Apertura 2012 results

Final phase

América advanced 3–2 on aggregate

Goalscorers

Regular season

Source:

Final phase

Results

Results summary

Results by round

Apertura 2012 Copa MX

Group stage

Apertura results

Goalscorers

Results

Results by round

Torneo Clausura

Squad

Regular season

Clausura 2013 results

Final phase

Cruz Azul advanced 4–3 on aggregate

Goalscorers

Regular season

Source:

Final phase

Results

Results summary

Results by round

Clausura 2013 Copa MX

Group stage

Clausura results

Goalscorers

Results

Results by round

References

Mexican football clubs 2012–13 season